Sibon irmelindicaprioae is a species of nonvenomous snake in the subfamily Dipsadinae. It is endemic to Panama. The discovery was made by the Ecuadorian biologist Alejandro Arteaga and the Panamanian biologist Abel Batista in 2023. Sibon irmelindicaprioae belongs to the genus Sibon, and subfamily Dipsadinae. This is also called DiCaprio’s snail-eating snake.

Description
This snake is found in the Chocó-Darién Gap forests of eastern Panama and western Colombia. Its habitat is the humid tropical climate.

References

Dipsadinae
Reptiles described in 2023
Snakes of South America
Fauna of Panama